Marino Marini (8 March 1804 – 15 April 1885) was an Italian prelate of the Catholic Church, who worked in the diplomatic service of the Holy See and the Roman Curia. He held the personal title of  Bishop of Orvieto from 1865 to 1871.

Biography
He was born in Ascoli Piceno. He worked in the nunciature in Madrid, then studied civil and canon law in Rome. From 1838 to 1850 he was vicar general in Frascati. He was a member of special pontifical delegations for briefs periods in Argentina and Mexico and then worked in the nunciature in Brazil from 1853 to 1856.  On 19 June 1857 he was appointed titular archbishop of Palmyra and Apostolic Delegate to Argentina, Bolivia, Chile, Uruguay, and Paraguay. On 17 March 1865 he was given the personal title of Bishop of Orvieto, which held until 15 October 1871. Beginning in 1868 he held positions in the Roman Curia, including Secretary of the Congregation for Extraordinary Ecclesiastical Affairs and Substitute of the Secretariat of State. He resigned those positions on 23 September 1875.

He attended the Vatican Council of 1869–70, where he was a member of the Commission on Discipline.

He died on 15 April 1885 at the age of 81.

References

External links
Catholic Hierarchy: Archbishop Marino Marini 

1804 births
1885 deaths
Apostolic Nuncios to Argentina
Apostolic Nuncios to Bolivia
Apostolic Nuncios to Chile
Apostolic Nuncios to Uruguay
Apostolic Nuncios to Paraguay
19th-century Italian Roman Catholic bishops